The Florence Marathon is an annual full-length marathon race held in late November in Florence, Italy, since 1984.

History
Established in 1984, the international competition has significantly grown in size since its inaugural edition of 462 runners – a total of 10,211 runners started the 2010 edition, making it the second largest Italian marathon after the Rome City Marathon.

Orlando Pizzolato, a two-time New York Marathon winner, was present to inaugurate the race in 1984.  The competition's first course was about a kilometre short of the true marathon distance, and it was increased for all subsequent editions.

Italians form the bulk of the runners, while France, Germany and the United Kingdom are usually the next most represented nationalities in the field. From 2005 to 2009, the competition was annually broadcast live for three hours on the state-owned Rai Tre channel. The race is among Italy's most prominent – it was selected to be the national championship marathon race for the first time in 2003.

The 2020 edition of the race was cancelled due to the coronavirus pandemic, with all registrants given the option of registering for 2021, 2022, or 2023 for free.

Course

Initial course 

The course used in the inaugural race was about  short.

From 2001 to 2009 

From 2001 through 2009, the course began at Piazzale Michelangelo and had a zigzagging path through the centre. The bends and cobblestone roads made for a particularly difficult marathon and this led to the change in 2011 for an easier, faster race.

An AIMS-certified course, it was ineligible for world records due to an overall net drop of 75 m from 2001 to 2009, but the current course is now eligible.

From 2010 to 2011 

Current course 

The course, which was  first used in 2012, starts at the Lungarno Pecori Giraldi  and finishes in Piazza Santa Croce. It passes through much of Florence's historical town centre, with architecture dating from the 13th century, including: Piazza della Signoria, Ponte Vecchio, and the Basilica of Santa Croce.

Winners 

The current course record holders are James Kutto, who set the men's record of 2:08:41 in 2006, and Lonah Chemtai Salpeter who set the female course record of 2:24:17 in 2018.

Key:
  Course record (in bold)
  Country's championship race
  Short course

By country

Participation

All statistics taken from the Association of Road Racing Statisticians.

Notes

References

External links
Official website

Marathons in Italy
Recurring sporting events established in 1984
Sport in Florence
1984 establishments in Italy
Autumn events in Italy